The 1962 Vermont gubernatorial election took place on November 6, 1962. Incumbent Republican F. Ray Keyser Jr. ran unsuccessfully for re-election to a second term as Governor of Vermont, losing to Democratic candidate Philip H. Hoff. Hoff was the first Democrat elected Governor of Vermont since 1853. This was also the last time an incumbent governor of Vermont was defeated for re-election.

Republican primary

Results

Democratic primary

Results

General election

Results

References

Vermont
1962
Gubernatorial
November 1962 events in the United States